Lathon is a surname. Notable people with the surname include:

Lamar Lathon (born 1967), American football player
Ray Lathon (1966–2000), American boxer

See also
 Lathan (name)